Esmeralda Herminia Mallada Invernizzi (born 10 January 1937) is a Uruguayan astronomer and professor who, for her contributions to that scientific discipline, has been honored with the designation of her name to an asteroid.

Career
Mallada was a student of cosmography with Professor Alberto Pochintesta. At the University of the Republic's , she was a colleague of Gladys Vergara, who helped her prepare for the  cosmography professorship competition. She became a professor of cosmography and mathematics in secondary education at age 21. She also taught at the university's , where she graduated with a licentiate in astronomy. She is currently retired.

On 16 October 1952, at the invitation of Pochintesta, she was one of the founders of the Association of Amateur Astronomers (AAA) in Uruguay, and in 2015 was made its honorary president. In 2015, the Minor Planet Center of the International Astronomical Union designated an asteroid that orbits between Mars and Jupiter with her name, 16277 Mallada. It is the first asteroid to bear the name of a Uruguayan woman astronomer.

Publications
Some of the works published by Mallada together with Julio A. Fernández are:
 "Distribution of Binding Energies in Wide Binaries"
 "Potential sources of terrestrial water close to Jupiter"
 "Dynamical Evolution of Wide Binaries"

References

External links
 Esmeralda Mallada at autores.uy
 Interview on El Observador TV at YouTube

1937 births
20th-century astronomers
20th-century Uruguayan educators
21st-century astronomers
21st-century Uruguayan educators
Living people
University of the Republic (Uruguay) alumni
Academic staff of the University of the Republic (Uruguay)
Uruguayan astronomers
Uruguayan educators
Uruguayan women educators
Women astronomers